Who Loved Him Best? is a 1918 American silent drama film directed by Dell Henderson and starring Edna Goodrich. It was produced and distributed by the Mutual Film Company, and was one of the last films it produced before it ceased operations in 1918. Actress Tallulah Bankhead has an early role in the feature.

Cast
Edna Goodrich as Doria Dane
Herbert Evans as George Steele
Miriam Folger as Mrs. Schuyler
Frank Otto as Harry North
Charles Martin as Gilbert Jasper
A. H. Busby as C. M. Winton
Nadia Gary as Amy Winton
Francois Du Barry as Assistant director
Tallulah Bankhead as Nell

Preservation
Who Loved Him Best? is preserved in the Library of Congress collection.

References

External links

1918 films
American silent feature films
American black-and-white films
Films directed by Dell Henderson
Silent American drama films
1918 drama films
1910s American films